Evgeny Mogilevsky (16 September 1945 – 28 January 2023) was a pianist. Son and pupil of Seraphima Mogilevsky at the Stolyarsky Music school in his hometown Odesa, Ukraine. Later studied with Heinrich Neuhaus and Yakov Zak at the Moscow Conservatory. He was the father of pianists Maxim and Alexander Mogilevsky.

In 1964 at the age of 18 he became the third Soviet pianist to win the Queen Elisabeth Competition, after Emil Gilels and Vladimir Ashkenazy. He has had a significant career, including internationally  (in the USA as a Sol Hurok artist). In the latter half of the 1970s he performed throughout the world as a soloist with the USSR State Symphony Orchestra under Yevgeny Svetlanov. His recording of Rachmaninoff's 3rd Piano Concerto (Kirill Kondrashin conducting) won several prizes.

In 1992 began teaching at the Brussels Conservatory.

Alexander Mogilevsky, violinist, was the brother of his grandfather.

References

External Links
 New York Times review of Mogilevsky's Carnegie Hall debut - October 27, 1992
 New York Times review of the documentary The Winners
 
 

1945 births
2023 deaths
Russian classical pianists
Male classical pianists
Soviet classical pianists
20th-century classical pianists
Prize-winners of the Queen Elisabeth Competition
Jewish classical pianists
21st-century classical pianists
20th-century Russian male musicians
21st-century Russian male musicians
Moscow Conservatory alumni